Roosevelt Junior High School may refer to:

Roosevelt Junior High School (Decatur, Illinois)
Roosevelt Elementary School (Philadelphia, Pennsylvania), formerly Theodore Roosevelt Junior High School
Roosevelt Junior High School, in the Roosevelt Independent School District near Roosevelt, Texas

See also
 Roosevelt Elementary School (disambiguation)
 Roosevelt High School (disambiguation)
 Roosevelt Intermediate School
 Roosevelt Middle School (disambiguation)
 Roosevelt School (disambiguation)